Cypriot Syllabary is the Unicode block encoding the Cypriot syllabary, a writing system for Greek used in Cyprus from the 9th-3rd centuries BCE.

History
The following Unicode-related documents record the purpose and process of defining specific characters in the Cypriot Syllabary block:

References 

Unicode blocks